Pectinophora scutigera, the Queensland pink bollworm or pinkspotted bollworm, is a moth of the family Gelechiidae. It was described by Holdaway in 1926 from Australia, where it occurs in coastal and central Queensland. It has also been recorded from Hawaii, New Guinea, Micronesia and New Caledonia.

Adults are very similar to Pectinophora gossypiella and can only be separated with certainty by an examination of the genitalia.

The larvae feed on Gossypium species, Hibiscus tiliaceus and Thespesia populnea. Practically all parts of the host plants are liable to attack, including squares, flowers, bolls in all stages, terminal shoots, boll pedicels and even fairly woody parts. Larvae often seem to browse on the green tissues of the outside of the bolls before entering the bolls, and sometimes make several holes in a group without gaining entrance to the boll through any of them.

External links

References

Moths described in 1926
Pexicopiini